Alistair Bruce Coe (born 9 January 1984) is an Australian politician and a former leader of the Liberal Party and Leader of the Opposition in the Australian Capital Territory (ACT). He was a member of the ACT Legislative Assembly from 2008 to 2021, representing the Ginninderra electorate from 2008 to 2016 and the Yerrabi electorate from 2016 to 2021. As Opposition Leader Coe led the Liberal Party to defeat at the 2020 election. He chose not to re-contest the party's leadership position, and resigned from the Assembly in 2021.

Legislative Assembly

Coe's first speech in the ACT Legislative Assembly was on 9 December 2008.

His portfolio responsibilities from 2008 to 2012 were as Shadow Minister for Urban Services, for Transport Services, for Housing, for Heritage, and for Youth. From 2012, Coe's responsibilities included Shadow Minister for Territory and Municipal Services, for Planning & Infrastructure, for Transport, and for Heritage.

At the 2012 election, Coe was returned with a quota of 0.9.

When Zed Seselja, then Leader of the Opposition, mounted a bid to win preselection for the Senate for the 2013 Australian federal election, Coe was elected as Deputy Leader of the Liberals.

Leader of the Opposition 
In the wake of a fifth consecutive Liberal defeat in the 2016 election, former leader Jeremy Hanson resigned, and Coe was elected as his replacement with Nicole Lawder as his deputy.

During the Australian Marriage Law Postal Survey, Coe was the only federal, state or territory party leader to oppose same-sex marriage.

Coe led the Canberra Liberals to the 2020 election. His party faced an uphill battle as soon as the campaign began, with the Greens declaring they would not support a Liberal coalition government. This almost certainly meant that the Liberals had to win a majority in order to govern, something only ever done once in ACT history.

Ultimately, the Liberals were defeated at the election, losing 2 seats. Coe conceded on election night, when it became apparent that a Labor-Greens coalition would return to power. On 27 October 2020, Coe was replaced by Elizabeth Lee as Leader of the Canberra Liberals and Leader of the Opposition. On 24 January 2021 Coe announced his forthcoming resignation from the Legislative Assembly, which became effective on 12 March 2021.

Personal life
Alistair Coe and Yasmin were married on 9 March 2013, at St Paul's Church, Manuka. He identifies as member of the Anglican Church and is pro-life.

He was the Deputy Chairman of the International Young Democrat Union in 2011.

See also

2020 Australian Capital Territory general election

References

External links

 Canberra Liberals

Liberal Party of Australia members of the Australian Capital Territory Legislative Assembly
1984 births
Living people
Members of the Australian Capital Territory Legislative Assembly
International Young Democrat Union chairs
21st-century Australian politicians